Raimund Schmidt (born 4 June 1960) is an Austrian rower. He competed in the men's single sculls event at the 1980 Summer Olympics.

References

1960 births
Living people
Austrian male rowers
Olympic rowers of Austria
Rowers at the 1980 Summer Olympics
Sportspeople from Vienna